BGHC 1 FC is a Canadian soccer team based in Toronto, Ontario. Founded in 2022, it is a member of the Canadian Soccer League.

The club was formed prior to the 2021 season as a merger between Brantford Galaxy and Hamilton City.

Players

Current squad

Year-by-year

References

Association football clubs established in 2022
B
Canadian Soccer League (1998–present) teams
2022 in Canadian soccer
2022 establishments in Ontario